Geertruida "Truus" Klapwijk (2 January 1904 – 3 May 1991) was a Dutch diver and freestyle swimmer who competed in the 1924 Summer Olympics and in the 1928 Summer Olympics. She was born and died in Rotterdam.

In 1924, she was a member of the Dutch relay team which finished sixth in the 4×100 metre freestyle relay competition. In the 400 metre freestyle event she was eliminated in the first round. She also participated in the 3 metre springboard contest but was also eliminated in the first round.

Four years later at the Amsterdam Games she finished seventh in the 3 metre springboard competition. In the 10 metre platform event she was eliminated in the first round.

External links

1904 births
1991 deaths
Dutch female divers
Dutch female freestyle swimmers
Olympic divers of the Netherlands
Olympic swimmers of the Netherlands
Swimmers at the 1924 Summer Olympics
Divers at the 1924 Summer Olympics
Divers at the 1928 Summer Olympics
Swimmers from Rotterdam
European Aquatics Championships medalists in swimming
Women's World Games medalists
20th-century Dutch women